Trail of the Everlasting Hero is a Chinese wuxia-fantasy television series based on the legend of the deity Wong Tai Sin. Directed by Kuk Kwok-leung and Zou Jicheng, the series starred Zhou Jie as the lead character while Sun Feifei, Xu Yun, Ti Lung, Ning Jing, Yu Chenghui, Hashimoto Reika and Tan Junyan played supporting roles. The series was first broadcast on Zhejiang TV Cultural Channel in mainland China in October 2005.

Plot
Set in the Eastern Jin dynasty, the story is adapted from Ge Hong's Shenxian Zhuan (神仙傳; Biographies of Immortals) and tells the adventures of Huang Chuming before he attained immortality and became widely known as Wong Tai Sin.

Cast
 Zhou Jie as Huang Chuming (Wong Tai Sin)
 Sun Feifei as Liu Yixi
 Xu Yun as Murong Yan
 Ti Lung as Wang Xizhi
 Ning Jing as Empress Dowager Yu
 Yu Chenghui as Taoist Chisong
 Hashimoto Reika as Su Tong
 Tan Junyan as Cao Jun
 Li Qingxiang as Marshal Cao
 Ji Chunhua as Shi Kongchen
 Li Fei as Shangguan Jianshi
 Zhang Zhilü as Sima Dan
 Li Xuesong as Shangguan Jue
 Sun Wei as Ding Kai
 Jin Song as Haotian
 Yan Hongzhi as Yitian

Production
Filming for the series started in June 2004 at Hengdian World Studios with a budget of 20,000,000 yuan.

The principal crew and cast members of Xiaying Xianzong went to Hangzhou on 29 September 2005 to promote the television series, which was first shown on Zhejiang TV Cultural Channel on 5 October.

On 2 July 2004, Liu Yunshan, the head of China's Publicity Department, visited Hengdian and interacted with the production team and cast members.

References

External links
  Xiaying Xianzong on Sina.com

2005 Chinese television series debuts
Television series set in the Eastern Jin (317–420)
Chinese wuxia television series
Shenmo television series
Mandarin-language television shows